Pseudocleobis is a genus of ammotrechid camel spiders, first described by Reginald Innes Pocock in 1900.

Species 
, the World Solifugae Catalog accepts the following twenty-one species:

 Pseudocleobis alticola Pocock, 1900 — Argentina, Bolivia
 Pseudocleobis andinus (Pocock, 1899) — Argentina, Bolivia, Chile, Peru
 Pseudocleobis arequipae Roewer, 1959 — Peru
 Pseudocleobis bardensis Maury, 1976 — Argentina
 Pseudocleobis calchaqui Maury, 1983 — Argentina
 Pseudocleobis chilensis Roewer, 1934 — Chile
 Pseudocleobis hirschmanni Kraepelin, 1911 — Bolivia, Chile
 Pseudocleobis huinca Maury, 1976 — Argentina
 Pseudocleobis ilavea Roewer, 1952 — Peru
 Pseudocleobis levii Maury, 1980 — Argentina
 Pseudocleobis morsicans (Gervais, 1849) — Argentina, Bolivia, Chile
 Pseudocleobis mustersi Maury, 1980 — Argentina
 Pseudocleobis orientalis Maury, 1976 — Argentina
 Pseudocleobis ovicornis Lawrence, 1954 — Peru
 Pseudocleobis peruviana Roewer, 1957 — Peru
 Pseudocleobis profanus Iuri & Iglesias, 2022 — Argentina
 Pseudocleobis puelche Maury, 1976 — Argentina
 Pseudocleobis solitarius Maury, 1976 — Argentina
 Pseudocleobis tarmana Roewer, 1952 — Peru
 Pseudocleobis titschacki (Roewer, 1942) — Peru
 Pseudocleobis truncatus Maury, 1976 — Argentina

References 

Arachnid genera
Solifugae